Adsul is an unincorporated community in Newton County, in the U.S. state of Texas.

History
A post office was established at Adsul in 1907, and remained in operation until 1911. The town's name is an amalgamation of Adams and Sullivan, the owners of a local sawmill.

References

Unincorporated communities in Newton County, Texas
Unincorporated communities in Texas